In philology, decipherment is the discovery of the meaning of texts written in ancient or obscure languages or scripts.  Decipherment in cryptography refers to decryption. The term is used sardonically in everyday language to describe attempts to read poor handwriting. In genetics, decipherment is the successful attempt to understand DNA, which is viewed metaphorically as a text containing word-like units. Throughout science the term decipherment is synonymous with the understanding of biological and chemical phenomena.

Ancient languages
In a few cases, a multilingual artifact has been necessary to facilitate decipherment, the Rosetta Stone being the classic example. Statistical techniques provide another pathway to decipherment, as does the analysis of modern languages derived from ancient languages in which undeciphered texts are written. Archaeological and historical information is helpful in verifying hypothesized decipherments.

Decipherers

See also

Deciphered scripts
 Cuneiform
 Egyptian hieroglyphs
 Kharoshthi
 Linear B
 Mayan
 Staveless Runes
 Cypriot Syllabary

Undeciphered scripts
 Rongorongo 
 Indus script
 Cretan hieroglyphs
 Byblos syllabary
 Linear A
 Linear Elamite
 Cypro-Minoan syllabary
 Espanca
 Numidian language

Undeciphered texts
 Phaistos Disc
 Rohonc Codex
 Voynich Manuscript

References

Cryptography
Writing systems
Genetics terms
Philology